The Welsh Sports Hall of Fame (WSHOF) is a charitable organisation created to commemorate the sporting achievements and preserve the artefacts of Welsh athletes. It was established in 1980 from the memorabilia collection of Welsh radio commentator G. V. Wynne-Jones. Since 1990, inductees to the exclusive "Roll of Honour" have been chosen annually by a trustees committee comprising representatives from athletics, media, universities and museums. The organisation has also given awards to individuals for outstanding contribution to Welsh sport. In 2018 an extra award was added to commemorate the former chairman, Rhodri Morgan. The first 'Rhodri' was awarded to the City of Cardiff for their outstanding service and commitment to sporting excellence.

The WSHOF Roll of Honour Citation

"Inclusion in the Roll of Honour is for those people who, by their achievement and by their example and conduct, in and beyond the sporting arena, have brought distinction to themselves and credit to Wales."

The Hall of Fame exhibition was on permanent exhibition at the Sports Council for Wales, South Glamorgan County Council, the Museum of Welsh Life until 2009, when it moved to the Millennium Stadium in Cardiff.

The committee of trustees is chaired by Prof Laura McAllister CBE, who took over from the former First Minister, Rhodri Morgan, in 2018 . The WSHOF committee consists of Prof Laura McAllister (chair – appointed 2018), Jeff Andrews (secretary), Dave Cobner, Rob Cole, Carolyn Hitt, Peter Jackson, Dylan Jones, Nicky Piper, Dave Roberts, Clive Williams., Andrew Weeks, Phil Davies, Andrew Walker.

Lynn Davies CBE was appointed as President of the WSHOF in 2018.

The WSHOF Roll of Honour Inductees
(* indicates posthumous award)

1990s

2000s

2010s

The Lord Brooks Award for Outstanding Services to Welsh Sport (formerly the WSH0F Special Award for Outstanding Services to Welsh Sport)

The Rhodri Morgan Memorial Award ('The Rhodri')

The Peter Corrigan Welsh Sports Media Award (formerly WSHoF Welsh Sports Journalist of the Year) 

Welsh Sports Hall of Fame official website

References
      4. https://www.loverugbyleague.com/post/roy-francis-inducted-into-welsh-sports-hall-of-fame/

5. https://www.bbc.co.uk/sport/wales/44584163

6. http://www.dai-sport.com/becky-james-youngest-famer-fab-four-insists-no-regrets/

All-sports halls of fame
Halls of fame in the United Kingdom
Sports museums in Wales
Museums in Cardiff
Awards established in 1980
1980 establishments in Wales
Welsh awards